This is the discography of the I've Sound singer Kotoko.

Albums

Studio albums

Compilation albums

Singles

Other album appearances

Other Appearances on albums

References

Discographies of Japanese artists
Pop music discographies